Jade Ellis Moore (born 22 October 1990) is an English footballer who plays as a midfielder for Reading of the Women's Super League, on loan from Manchester United.

She has previously played in England for Reading, Notts County, Birmingham City, Leeds United and Lincoln City, for Orlando Pride in the National Women's Soccer League, and Atlético Madrid in the Spanish Primera División. Moore represented England at junior levels and made her debut for the senior national team in 2012. She represented her country at UEFA Women's Euro 2013 and both the 2015 and 2019 FIFA Women's World Cup, winning a bronze medal in 2015.

Club career
Moore joined Lincoln City from Doncaster Rovers Belles in 2005. In 2007 Moore signed for Leeds United and played in that season's FA Women's Cup final defeat to Arsenal. She also started a 3–1 Premier League Cup final win over Everton on 11 February 2010, to help Leeds win their first major silverware. In December 2010, Moore was revealed to have signed for Birmingham City's FA WSL squad.

Moore started against Chelsea in the 2012 FA Women's Cup Final, which Birmingham eventually won after a penalty shootout. In June 2016, Moore and teammate Jo Potter both bought out the last six months of their Birmingham City contracts and left the club as free agents. Despite the players' long service, a statement on Birmingham City Ladies' website called the development "an excellent deal for the club".

Later that month Moore and Potter joined Notts County on short term deals until the end of the 2016 FA WSL season. Less than a year later, however, the club folded before the 2017 FA WSL Spring Series. Becoming a free agent, Moore joined Reading along with teammates Jo Potter and Kirsty Linnett in May 2017.

On 1 April 2020, Moore signed for Orlando Pride in the NWSL, the first time she had signed outside of England. The season was postponed due to the coronavirus pandemic with the NWSL eventually scheduling a smaller schedule 2020 NWSL Challenge Cup tournament. However, on 22 June 2020, the team withdrew from the tournament following positive COVID-19 tests among both players and staff.

On 18 August 2020, having been unable to feature for Orlando Pride, Moore joined Spanish Primera División team Atlético Madrid on loan until February 2021. She made her Atléti debut on 21 August, starting in a Champions League quarter-final defeat to Barcelona during the restart of the 2019–20 UEFA Women's Champions League. Her loan was terminated on 20 December 2020.

Moore made her Orlando Pride debut on 10 April 2021, 12 months after first signing with the club, against Racing Louisville FC during the 2021 NWSL Challenge Cup tournament. She started all four games during the Challenge Cup before suffering a knee injury prior to the start of the regular season which kept her out for the rest of the year. She was extended a contract offer to return in 2022 but did not sign.

On 27 January 2022, Moore returned to England to sign with Manchester United, now coached by Marc Skinner who had signed Moore for Orlando Pride and who she had previously worked with at Birmingham City.

On 28 January 2023, Moore rejoined Reading on loan for the remainder of the 2022–23 season.

International career
A 15-year-old Moore made her debut for England Under-17s. She has since represented England at Under-19, Under-20 and Under-23 levels. Moore played in the FIFA U-20 Women's World Cup in both 2008 and 2010.

Moore also featured in England's 2009 UEFA Women's Under-19 Championship final win, against Sweden in Belarus. She received her first call up to the senior squad in October 2011, ahead of a UEFA Women's Euro 2013 qualifying tie against the Netherlands. Moore won her first senior international cap in February 2012, playing 90 minutes of England's 3–1 Cyprus Cup win over Finland. On the occasion of her third cap, Moore scored against Italy as England were beaten 3–1 in the competition's third place play–off.

National coach Hope Powell picked Moore in her squad for UEFA Women's Euro 2013, but she remained an unused substitute in all three matches as England crashed out in the first round. When Mark Sampson replaced Powell as England coach, he named Moore in his first squad in December 2013. In May 2015, Sampson named Moore in his final squad for the 2015 FIFA Women's World Cup, where the team finished third. Moore was named to her third consecutive major tournament finals squad when Sampson selected her to his UEFA Women's Euro 2017 squad in April 2017.

In May 2019, Moore was called up to the 2019 FIFA Women's World Cup squad. She played in four games including two starts against Argentina in the group stage and Sweden in the third-place playoff as England finished fourth.

Personal life
Moore was a student at Leeds Metropolitan University. As a 16-year-old she had won a Football Association scholarship to Loughborough University, where a routine screening revealed two holes in her heart. Moore was able to resume training two weeks after surgery. After graduating from university in 2013, Moore set up her own sports therapy business.

Career statistics

Club 
.

International goals
England score listed first, score column indicates score after each Moore goal.

Honours

Club
Leeds United
FA Women's Premier League Cup: 2010

Birmingham City
FA Cup: 2012

International
England
FIFA Women's World Cup third place: 2015

References

External links

Profile  at the Football Association website

1990 births
Living people
English women's footballers
Notts County L.F.C. players
FA Women's National League players
Birmingham City W.F.C. players
Women's Super League players
England women's under-23 international footballers
England women's international footballers
2015 FIFA Women's World Cup players
Footballers from Worksop
Women's association football midfielders
Leeds United Women F.C. players
Reading F.C. Women players
2019 FIFA Women's World Cup players
Orlando Pride players
Expatriate women's soccer players in the United States
English expatriate sportspeople in the United States
English expatriate sportspeople in Spain
Expatriate women's footballers in Spain
Primera División (women) players
Atlético Madrid Femenino players
National Women's Soccer League players
Manchester United W.F.C. players
UEFA Women's Euro 2017 players